Mike Stutzel (born February 28, 1979) is a Canadian former professional ice hockey player who played nine games in the National Hockey League (NHL) for the Phoenix Coyotes in 2003–04.  He also played 13 games in Finland's SM-liiga for Tappara. Before turning pro, he played hockey at Northern Michigan University in Marquette, Michigan from 1999 - 2003 where he scored 27 regular season goals his senior year. Stutzel was born in Victoria, British Columbia.

Career statistics

Regular season and playoffs

External links
 

1979 births
Living people
Canadian expatriate ice hockey players in Finland
Canadian expatriate ice hockey players in Scotland
Canadian expatriate ice hockey players in the United States
Canadian ice hockey left wingers
Canadian people of German descent
Edinburgh Capitals players
Ice hockey people from British Columbia
Idaho Steelheads (ECHL) players
Northern Michigan Wildcats men's ice hockey players
Phoenix Coyotes players
Prince George Spruce Kings players
Sportspeople from Victoria, British Columbia
Springfield Falcons players
Tappara players
Undrafted National Hockey League players
Utah Grizzlies (AHL) players
Victoria Salmon Kings players